Jonathan Wutawunashe is a songwriter, guitarist, keyboard player and producer.

Background

As leader of the gospel group Family Singers, his creativity spurred the new Zimbabwean gospel genre into the limelight. With the release of the video for his wife Shuvai's hit "Nditorei", which he produced, a new culture in the projection of the genre was born. Wutawunashe shot the footage and edited the video himself. His family belongs to a megachurch called Family of God Church. He was the second born in a family of five children. His siblings are Andrew (an elder brother), Erasmus, Edna (sister) and Amos the last born in the family. His brother Andrew, referred to by church members as "Prophet", is the founder and leader of the church which has branches all over the world, including Africa, Europe and the United States.

"Nditorei", "Tarira Nguva", "Shelter" and "Ndasukwa" have become iconic anthems thanks to the combination of Shuvai's trademark vocals, Jonathan's production skills and creativity with video.

Discography
"Vana Vanokosha" (has been covered by other artists)
"Komborera"
"It's No Secret"
"To Be a Christian"
"Glorious"
"Helele"
"Ndovimba"
"You Can't Fall" (sung by Shuvai)
"Rudo Rukuru" (sung by Shuvai)

Wutawunashe has several productions, which include African Praise, a praise medley for which he and Shuvai wrote many original songs and numerous albums featuring up-and-coming artists, as well as his group, Family Singers. Since 1994, he has allowed gospel artists to share his recording studio, which he pieced together over the years. Jonathan launched Gospel Bandstand with his wife Shuvai earlier this year.  It is a TV show aimed at mentoring and showcasing new gospel talent.

References

Zimbabwean musicians
Zimbabwean gospel singers
Living people
Year of birth missing (living people)